The Men's 100 kg powerlifting event at the 2004 Summer Paralympics was competed  on 27 September. It was won by Kazem Rajabigolojeh, representing .

Final round

27 Sept. 2004, 13:45

References

M